High Level Assembler or HLASM is IBM's current assembler programming language for its z/OS, z/VSE, z/VM and z/TPF operating systems on z/Architecture mainframe computers.  There is also a version that runs on Linux, primarily intended for systems running on a z/Architecture system (this environment is sometimes referred to as Linux on IBM Z).

Overview
HLASM was released in June 1992 replacing IBM's Assembler H Version 2.  Despite the name, HLASM on its own does not have many of the features normally associated with a high-level assembler, but does offer a number of improvements over Assembler H and Assembler(XF), such as labeled and dependent USINGs, more complete cross-reference information, and additional macro language capabilities such as the ability to write user-defined functions.
While working at IBM, John Robert Ehrman created and was the lead developer for HLASM and is considered the "father of high level assembler".

High Level Assembler Toolkit
The High Level Assembler Toolkit is a separately priced accompaniment to the High Level Assembler.  The toolkit contains: 
 A set of structured programming macros — 
IF/ELSE/ENDIF
DO/ENDDO
STRTSRCH/ORELSE/ENDLOOP/ENDSRCH
CASENTRY/CASE/ENDCASE
SELECT/WHEN/OTHRWISE/ENDSEL.
 A disassembler.
 A "Program Understanding Tool" (re-engineering aid).
 A Source XREF utility (cross-reference facility).
 Interactive Debug Facility.
 Enhanced SuperC (source comparison tool).

See also
 IBM Basic assembly language and successors

Notes

References

External links

 IBM HLASM Online Manuals
 

High-level
High Level Assembler
Assembly languages
Assembler High level
IBM mainframe software